Dihydroxytoluene may refer to:

 2,3,4-trihydroxytoluene (caricaphenyl triol) of the papaya plant
 2,3,5-trihydroxytoluene, a product of orcinol catalysis

See also
 Hydroxytoluene
 Dihydroxytoluene
 Trinitrotoluene